William Edward Garbett (born 14 September 1949) is an English former professional footballer who scored 40 goals from 200 appearances in the Football League playing on the right wing for Shrewsbury Town, Barrow and Stockport County. He also played non-league football for Telford United.

References

1949 births
Living people
People from Dawley
English footballers
Association football wingers
Shrewsbury Town F.C. players
Barrow A.F.C. players
Stockport County F.C. players
Telford United F.C. players
English Football League players